Ángel Raúl Sosa Hernández (born 26 January 1976) is a Mexican former footballer. He is a nephew of singer José José.

Born in Mexico City, Sosa began playing youth football with local sides Pumas UNAM and Cruz Azul. In 1996, manager Enrique Meza brought Sosa to Toros Neza where he would make his professional debut. Sosa played professional football for 10 seasons, including a successful spell with Club Necaxa in the Primera Division. Sosa also had a brief spell in Major League Soccer with Colorado Rapids.

References

 
 

1976 births
Living people
Association football forwards
Club Necaxa footballers
San Luis F.C. players
Correcaminos UAT footballers
C.D. Veracruz footballers
Toros Neza footballers
Footballers from Mexico City
Mexican footballers